Ixcatec or Ixcateco may refer to:
 Ixcatecos, an ethnic group of Mexico
 Ixcatec language, a language of Mexico